Tagab is a place in Shahidi Hassas District, Orūzgān Province, Afghanistan.

See also
 Orūzgān Province

References

Populated places in Urozgan Province